No. 76 Operational Training Unit RAF (76 OTU) was a Royal Air Force operational training unit during the Second World War.

The unit was formed at RAF Aqir on 1 October 1943. Throughout its existence it was equipped with Vickers Wellington bombers - Mk. III and Mk. Xs (by October 1944 all the aircraft were Mk. Xs) and trained crews for night bombing operations with RAF squadrons in the Middle East. The Mk. X was the last of the bomber variants and the most numerous. It was generally similar to the Mk. III, but had the more powerful Hercules VI or XVI engine with downdraught carburettor. It can be distinguished externally from the earlier marks by the carburettor intake placed on top of the engine cowling – as in the photo from the IWM collection.

76 OPERATIONAL TRAINING UNIT – WELLINGTON MEDIUM BOMBERS. EIGHT WEEK COURSE:
FORMATION OF CREW – PILOT- NAVIGATOR- BOMB AIMER-FLIGHT ENGINEER- WIRELESS OPERATOR – AND TWO AIR GUNNERS.
DAY AND NIGHT FLYING.
TRAINING- AIR GUNNERS-AIR TO DROGUE FIRING – AIR TO SEA FIRING – FIGHTER AFFILIATION AND EVASIVE ACTIONS.
COMBINED CREW EXERCISES – DAY AND NIGHT CROSS COUNTRY/SEA FLIGHTS OF 5 TO 6 HOURS AT 10–15,000FT.
1675 HEAVY CONVERSION UNIT – B.24 LIBERATOR. FOUR WEEK CONVERSION COURSE – RAF ABU SUEIR.

Pilot Matt Kennedy's account of his time at Aqir:

"...No.5 ACRC Cairo: We were held at Cairo until 8 October when we entrained for No.1 ACRC Jerusalem, Palestine.  We were held at Jerusalem for 20 days and finally posted to No.76 OTU Aqir, Palestine 28th October, 1944.
 
Here is where we would crew up and learn to fly Wellingtons. As soon as we arrived we heard that a crew had crashed and had been killed and volunteers were being sought for a burial party. Not a very auspicious welcome!

After settling in, all of us, pilots, navigators, bomb aimers, wireless ops, flight engineers and gunners were assembled in a drill area and told to crew up. It seemed quite a haphazard method. I heard someone with a Scottish accent who turned out to be Jim Mitchell, Wireless Op. So he joined me along with another Scot, Dave Bremner as Flight Engineer. We then got talking to Maurice Harmes who came along as bomb aimer. He asked me if we could take Stan and Charlie Mansfield as gunners. They were twin brothers and their mother had got a special dispensation from the Air Ministry to allow them to fly together on the same crew. The last member to join us was Cyril King who came as Navigator.

We were fortunate, in that, in spite of the way crewing was done, we ended up with a happy, efficient crew who got along well with each other. Our first training consisted of Ground School, learning all about the workings of the Wellington's hydraulic and electrical systems plus the use of the oxygen and radio telephone systems. We had to pass a written test on these procedures. The next stage, as a crew, was parachute and dinghy drills on how to exit from a plane. An old Blenheim at a swimming pool was used for this.

Finally, on November 21st, we were taken on Wellington familiarization flights by a W/O Trollope who was Australian. He was a pleasant, laid back, really nice guy. After 4½ hours dual instruction, I was allowed to take my crew on my own. For the next few days we flew on our own as a crew doing circuits and bumps, single engine landings, flapless landings and overshoots. The next step was practicing formation flying and then evasive cine where we had a Hurricane, equipped with a movie camera, attack us and we would try to evade and he would record our success or failure. We proceeded from there to air-to-air firing where the gunners shot at drogues and then did cross-country trips including high level bombing. We did a lot of these and then on December 22nd W/O Trollope took us on night circuits and bumps.

After 2hrs 50 mins night dual instruction we were allowed to continue on our own. We did about a dozen night cross-country exercises with bombing practice, and finally on 21st January 1945 we were posted to No.1675 Heavy Conversion Unit, Abu Sueir, Egypt. On January 31st we had our first familiarization trip on a B24 Liberator..."

He also says: “...All the planes were Wellington X. They had unit numbers. In my log book they were 20 up to 52 and underneath the unit number I had entered what looks like serial numbers e.g:  LP143, LN 957 etc...” (20 – 52 equates to 33 aircraft)

Serials from Matt Kennedy's Log Book: (All: Vickers (271) Type 440 Wellington B.X)
JA350  
LN495 
LN670 
LN852 
LN957 
LN965
LP143 
LP184
LP248 
LP265 
LP393 
LP457 
ME992 
MF372 
MF401 
MF988

& others:
HF462
LP197
LP294

The unit was disbanded on 30 July 1945.

The bomber pilot Cyril Spurdens flew with the unit.

References

Operational training units of the Royal Air Force
Military units and formations in Mandatory Palestine in World War II
Military units and formations disestablished in 1945